George Ciprian (born Gheorghe Pană Constantin ; June 7, 1883 – 8 May 1968) was a Romanian actor and playwright. His writings make him a precursor of the Theatre of the Absurd.

Biography
Born in Buzău to a Greek baker's family, he attended primary school in Glodeanu-Siliștea, a commune near Buzău, after which he moved to Bucharest with his mother. There, he attended Gheorghe Lazăr High School, together with Vasile Voiculescu, a future poet born near Buzău, and Urmuz, an absurdist writer.

After graduation, Ciprian went on to study acting at the Bucharest Conservatory, where he was coached by Constantin Nottara.

His stage debut took place in 1907 at the Craiova National Theatre, as Șoltuz in Bogdan Petriceicu Hasdeu's Răzvan și Vidra. He would star in many theater performances in theatres throughout Romania, and he would act in several movies.

Ciprian died in Bucharest. The only theatre in his native city, Buzău, bears his name. The theatre was inaugurated in 1996 with a performance of Omul cu mârțoaga.

Author
His first play, Omul cu mârțoaga (The Man and His Old Crock) had its premiere in 1927, and became very successful. His best known play is Capul de rățoi (The Drake's Head), written in 1938, and acknowledged as an early example of absurdist theatre. This play draws on his adolescence and friendship with Urmuz.

Late in his life, he authored an autobiography, Măscărici și Mâzgălici (translatable as "Jester and Scribbler"), which notably contains versions of several texts by Urmuz (as memorized by Ciprian), as well as details on the latter's final years.

Works
 Omul cu mârțoaga (The Man and His Old Crock), 1927
 Nae Niculae, 1928
 Capul de rățoi (The Drake's Head), 1938
 Ioachim - prietenul poporului (Ioachim - Friend of the People), 1947
 Un lup mâncat de oaie (A Wolf Eaten by a Sheep), 1947

External links
Short bio

Romanian people of Greek descent
People from Buzău
Romanian male stage actors
Romanian male film actors
Romanian dramatists and playwrights
Romanian memoirists
Theatre of the Absurd
Gheorghe Lazăr National College (Bucharest) alumni
1883 births
1968 deaths
20th-century Romanian dramatists and playwrights
20th-century memoirists
Burials at Bellu Cemetery